Hartsdale is a hamlet located in the town of Greenburgh, Westchester County, New York, United States. The population was 5,293 at the 2010 census. It is a suburb of New York City.

History
It is served by the Metro-North Harlem River commuter rail line into Grand Central Terminal. Hartsdale is the home of America's first canine pet cemetery (started by veterinarian Samuel Johnson in 1896), and the world's first Carvel Ice Cream store (1934), which closed in 2008.

Pre-Colonial Period
Hartsdale's earliest settlers were the Wecquaesgeek (sometimes spelled Weckquaesgeek), a sub-tribe of the Algonquian tribe that lived in most of southern New York, from Westchester down through Manhattan. Weekquaeskeek is an Algonquian term believed to mean "place of the bark kettle", and this kettle appears in the Greenburgh town seal.

Colonial Era and American Revolution
After the earliest British colonialists arrived, the area was developed under the manor system when Frederick Philipse, a Dutch merchant and British Loyalist, was "given" the land by the British government. As lord of his Philipse Manor, he leased his land to tenant farmers who, at least for a time, were believed to have lived alongside their Native American neighbors.

There is evidence to show that Hartsdale played a significant role during the Revolutionary War, some of which still stands today. On October 28, 1776, a Revolutionary War battle was fought alongside the Bronx River, near the site of the current Hartsdale train station. The Odell House (on Ridge Road, built in 1732) served as the headquarters for the French general the Comte de Rochambeau, and is where the count and George Washington are supposed to have formed an alliance leading to the Battle of Yorktown. The house was later named after John Odell, Washington's guide who bought the house in 1785. In 1965, his descendants deeded the house to the Sons of the American Revolution, and today the house is in severe decay, awaiting funds to transform it into a museum.

After the Continental Army and American colonialists won the Revolutionary War, Frederick Philipse III (third lord of the manor and great-grandson to Frederick Philipse I) fled, his land was confiscated and sold to the remaining farming tenants, many of whom were descendants of the Hart family. The intersection of Central Park Avenue and Hartsdale Avenue was named "Hart's Corners" after Robert Hart, one of these farmers who successfully bid for the land, and in the mid-19th century the entire area became known as "Hartsdale".

19th Century
The area remained largely agrarian until 1865, when Eleazar Hart deeded land for the development of the New York and Harlem Railroad line into Manhattan, setting the stage for Hartsdale's change into a more cosmopolitan commuter village. Between 1880 and 1940, large tracts of farmland and estates were subdivided and converted into private houses and apartments at a furious pace. By the 1960s, almost no remaining farmland was left for sale.

20th Century
In 1904, the successful German-Jewish banker Felix M. Warburg (1871–1937) purchased large tracts of land to build his  "Woodlands" estate in Hartsdale, a summer home next to the country club where he and his wife Frieda Schiff Warburg (1876–1958) spent considerable time. The estate would later become an important site in the history of modern American ballet, when on June 10, 1934, their son Edward M. M. Warburg (1908–1992) helped produce the first American performance of George Balanchine's masterpiece "Serenade". In keeping with the family's philanthropic efforts, Frieda Schiff Warburg, on her death in 1958, bequeathed a remaining   to the town of Greenburgh to build a public school. These  are now the home of the Greenburgh Central School District  (formerly called Greenburgh Central 7 School District) and Woodlands High School. The main Warburg mansion currently serves as the school district headquarters, but other remnants from the original estate grounds can still be seen standing in the surrounding woods and neighboring streets. The Warburg family's New York City home would later be donated to become the Jewish Museum of New York.

On February 9, 1928, Hartsdale made history when the Scottish inventor John Logie Baird (1888–1946) transmitted the world's first inter-continental short-wave television signal from a transmitter (call sign 2KZ) in Coulsdon, Surrey (a suburb of London) to his colleague O. G. Hutchinson in the cellar of Robert M. Hart, an amateur radio operator (call sign 2CVJ) in Hartsdale.

In 1932, Henry Jacques Gaisman, inventor and founder of the Gillette safety razor blade, purchased  of land along Ridge Road, most of which he purchased from George A. C.  Christiancy, son of the former U.S. minister to Peru, Isaac Peckham Christiancy. In 1952, at age 82, Gaisman married his nurse Catherine "Kitty" Vance Gaisman, aged 33, a former Catholic nun. In 1957, he and his wife Catherine (Mrs. Henry J. Gaisman) passed the title for his land to the New York Archdiocese for $600,000, with the agreement that they could live there as long as they wished. Mr. Gaisman died in 1974 at age 104, and Mrs. Gaisman remained on the estate until she moved to Connecticut in 1995. In 1999, the estate was saved from sale and development when the Town of Greenburgh acquired the property and reopened it as the Hart's Brook Nature Preserve. Part of the agreement included the preservation of some portion of the estate as a home for retired Catholic nuns. Today the Catherine and Henry J. Gaisman Foundation continues to donate large amounts of money to support medical research.

On a hot Memorial Day weekend in 1934, Greek immigrant and ice cream salesman Tom Carvelas was selling ice cream from his truck around roads in Westchester, when he broke down with a flat tire along Central Avenue in Hartsdale. With his ice cream melting rapidly, he decided to simply sell it along the side of Central Avenue where his truck broke down. Successful at selling his stock at this location, he decided to buy the plot of land where he was stuck, and in 1936 he opened up the world's first Carvel ice cream store. The store stood on the southbound side of Central Avenue (just south of the "Four Corners" section of Hartsdale) until October 5, 2008, when the store was closed and the land sold to developers. The original store has since been demolished. To commemorate the birth of Carvel ice cream in Hartsdale, the Hartsdale Fire Company distributes Carvel "Flying Saucers" from Fire Station 1 after every Memorial Day parade.

Salvation Army leader Evangeline Cory Booth (1865–1950), originally from London, lived in Hartsdale until her death on July 17, 1950. The classical music composer Charles Ives also lived and commuted from Hartsdale for a brief period. Other influential people who have lived in Hartsdale include the artist/sculptor Malvina Hoffman, American businessman Vernon Jordan, National Urban League president John Edward Jacob, pro-wrestler "Classy" Freddie Blassie, actor Peter Riegert, singer/musician/composer Billy Vera, actress Shera Danese (wife of Peter Falk), novelist and educator Michael Rubin, Mad magazine artist Jack Davis, and Nobel laureate Louis J. Ignarro.

Geography

Hartsdale is one of the few communities immediately surrounding New York City that still has two working farms, both on Secor Road. It also has several parks, including the  Secor Woods Park, the  Ridge Road Park, and  Rumbrook Park.

The town can generally be subdivided into several areas, including the "Village" or downtown part (East Hartsdale Avenue), Manor Woods, Windsor Park, Poet's Corner, Ridge Road, Orchard Hill, College Corners, or more specifically one of the several condominium developments built since the 1970s. Over the years, the town has attracted many different ethnic groups, and the downtown village has a significant Japanese population with Japanese shops, restaurants, real-estate brokers, and even a Japanese supermarket all within walking distance of East Hartsdale Avenue.

Ferncliff Cemetery is located on Secor Road in Hartsdale, famous as the burial grounds for many celebrities including Aaliyah, Malcolm X, Heavy D, Judy Garland, Jerome Kern, Joan Crawford, Basil Rathbone, Ed Sullivan, Jam-Master Jay, James Baldwin, Michel Fokine, Tom Carvel, Oscar Hammerstein, Thelonious Monk, Paul Robeson, Minnesota Timberwolves Guard Malik Sealy, soprano Arleen Auger, and others. British rocker John Lennon, U.S. Vice President Nelson Rockefeller, and Muppets creator Jim Henson were cremated there. Composer Béla Bartók was initially buried in Hartsdale before being reinterred in his native Hungary in 1988. Radio DJ Alan Freed was also initially interred in Hartsdale until his ashes were moved to the Rock and Roll Hall of Fame in 2002.

The Hartsdale Railroad Station was listed on the National Register of Historic Places in 2011, as was the Evangeline Booth House in Hartsdale hamlet.

Hartsdale is located at  (41.03, −73.80).

Major roads include NY 100 and the Bronx River Parkway. For mass transit to NYC, residents can take either Metro-North Railroad's Harlem Line or the Bee-Line Bus routes 1X, 3, 20, 21, and BxM4C.  Bee-Line also provides local service on bus routes 34, 38, 39, 43, and 65.

Demographics

As of the census of 2000, there were 9,830 people, 4,314 households, and 2,756 families residing in the community. The population density was 3,068.0 per square mile (1,186.1/km2). There were 4,478 housing units at an average density of 1,397.6/sq mi (540.3/km2). The racial makeup of the community was 76.14% White, 8.71% African American, 0.19% Native American, 10.17% Asian, 0.04% Pacific Islander, 2.64% from other races, and 2.10% from two or more races. Hispanic or Latino of any race were 9.55% of the population.

There were 4,314 households, out of which 24.3% had children under the age of 18 living with them, 53.1% were married couples living together, 8.6% had a female householder with no husband present, and 36.1% were non-families. 31.8% of all households were made up of individuals, and 12.7% had someone living alone who was 65 years of age or older. The average household size was 2.27 and the average family size was 2.86.

In the CDP the population was spread out, with 18.2% under the age of 18, 4.8% from 18 to 24, 30.3% from 25 to 44, 28.8% from 45 to 64, and 17.9% who were 65 years of age or older. The median age was 43 years. For every 100 females there were 86.2 males. For every 100 females age 18 and over, there were 81.2 males.

The median income for a household in the community was $81,824, and the median income for a family was $100,330. Males had a median income of $62,362 versus $47,380 for females. The per capita income for the community was $45,691. About 1.6% of families and 2.6% of the population were below the poverty line, including 1.5% of those under age 18 and 4.6% of those age 65 or over.

Hartsdale has a sizable Japanese American community.

In addition, there is an Albanian Catholic Church in Hartsdale with the name "Our Lady of Shkodra".

Notable people
Sean Casten, Democratic Congressman in Illinois 6th district, grew up in Hartsdale and is an alumnus of Woodlands HS.
Arleen Auger, soprano
Mike "SuperJew" Epstein, Major League Baseball player
Morris E. Lasker, US federal judge
Charles Wellford Leavitt, landscape architect, urban planner, and civil engineer 
Allan Rosenfield, academic
Billy Vera, composer/songwriter/singer/producer/actor, grew up in Hartsdale and attended Sacred Heart school
Mary Ritter Beard, women's history archivist and lifelong advocate of social justice, devoted wife of Philosopher Charles Beard, is interred at Ferncliff Cemetery.
Tom Carvel, inventor of soft serve ice cream and the Carvel ice cream franchise.

In popular culture
The popular J-pop rap/R&B duo Heartsdales borrow their name from Hartsdale, as the two members spent considerable time here.

On the NBC series Heroes, The Company's Primatech Research facility and home of Level 5 is located in Hartsdale.

One scene from the comedy film The Other Guys was filmed at the Harmon Discount in Hartsdale.

References

External links
 Town of Greenburgh, New York
 Smithsonian archive page on Carvel Ice Cream

Greenburgh, New York
Census-designated places in Westchester County, New York
Hamlets in Westchester County, New York